Blel Kadri (born 3 September 1986) is a former French professional road racing cyclist, who most recently rode for UCI ProTeam . He is of Algerian descent.

Career

2013
In March 2013, Kadri won the Roma Maxima, a newly revived race formerly known as the Giro del Lazio. He managed to resist to the peloton's onslaught and triumphed in Rome.

2014
On 12 July 2014, he achieved his biggest success, winning his first stage victory in the Tour de France. Also, on this stage, he won the Most Combative Rider award for the second time during the Tour de France and held the King of the Mountains jersey.

Post-cycling
After retiring from professional racing, he was working in the cycling aisle of a department store in Toulouse.

Career achievements

Major results

2007
 7th Overall Giro delle Regioni
2008
 2nd Overall Ronde de l'Isard
1st Stage 2
 7th Overall Tour du Haut-Anjou
2009
 3rd Grand Prix de Plumelec-Morbihan
 7th Trophée des Grimpeurs
2010
 7th Overall Route du Sud
1st Stage 2
 9th Overall Étoile de Bessèges
2011
 2nd Overall Circuit de la Sarthe
 4th Overall Bayern–Rundfahrt
 8th Overall Tour Down Under
 10th Overall Volta a Catalunya
2012
 1st  Mountains classification, Route du Sud
 10th Les Boucles du Sud Ardèche
2013
 1st Roma Maxima
  Combativity award Stage 2 Tour de France
2014
 Tour de France
1st Stage 8
Held  after Stage 8
 Combativity award Stages 2 & 8

Grand Tour general classification results timeline

References

External links

Cycling Base: Blel Kadri

Ag2r-La Mondiale: Blel Kadri

1986 births
Living people
French male cyclists
Sportspeople from Bordeaux
2014 Tour de France stage winners
French Tour de France stage winners
French sportspeople of Algerian descent
Cyclists from Nouvelle-Aquitaine